Nada Mali (born 21 October 1979 in Borovnica) is a Slovenian slalom canoer who competed from the mid-1990s to the mid-2000s. Competing in two Summer Olympics, she earned her best finish of 17th in the K-1 event at the 2000 Summer Olympics in Sydney, but did not advance beyond the qualifying round in either Olympics she competed.

References
Sports-Reference.com profile
Yahoo! Sports Athens 2004 profile

1979 births
Canoeists at the 2000 Summer Olympics
Canoeists at the 2004 Summer Olympics
Living people
Olympic canoeists of Slovenia
Slovenian female canoeists
People from the Municipality of Borovnica